Stones River may refer to:
Stones River, a river in Tennessee
Battle of Stones River
Stones River Campaign
Stones River National Battlefield, in Rutherford County, Tennessee
Stones River Greenway Arboretum, in Murfreesboro, Tennessee

See also
Stony River (disambiguation)